The Journal of Youth Studies is a peer-reviewed academic journal covering youth studies. It was established in 1998 and is published ten times per year by Taylor & Francis. The editors-in-chief are Robert MacDonald (Monash University), Tracy Shildrick (Newcastle University), and Dan Woodman (University of Melbourne). According to the Journal Citation Reports, the journal has a 2017 impact factor of 1.724, ranking it 26th out of 98 journals in the category "Social Sciences, Interdisciplinary".

References

External links

Publications established in 1998
Taylor & Francis academic journals
English-language journals
Adolescence journals
10 times per year journals